The IBM 9020 was an IBM System/360 computer adapted into a multiprocessor system for use by the U.S. FAA for Air Traffic Control. Systems were installed in the FAA's 20 en route Air Route Traffic Control Centers (ARTCCs), beginning in the late 1960s. The U.K. CAA also installed a system in its London centre. The IBM 9020A, for example, was based on the S/360-50 and the 9020D used two out of three or four S/360-65 processors for flight and radar data processing with two out of three S/360-50 processors providing input/output capability.

There were three operational variants of the 9020 system: 9020A CCC (Central Computer Complex); 9020D CCC; and 9020E DCC (Display Channel Complex). All the 9020A CCCs were attached to a non-IBM display complex, while the 9020D CCCs could be attached to either a non-IBM display complex or to the IBM 9020E DCC. The 9020A and 9020D CCCs carried out flight and radar data processing but needed an attached display complex to provide a plan view display to the air traffic controllers. The non-IBM display complex was the Raytheon 730 in the U.S. and the Plessey Processed Radar Display System (PRDS) in the U.K.

Each FAA ARTCC had a System Maintenance Monitor Console (SMMC) that brought together the status indications of the installed 9020 system(s) as well as related components, such as environmental systems and communications links.

A maximum configuration CCC/DCC complex contained 12 IBM S/360 mainframes. Not all FAA ARTCCs, of which there were 20, had the maximum configuration. The U.K. centre had a 9020D "Triplex" system with six IBM S/360s (three S/360-65s and three S/360-50s).

In addition to the 21 ARTCCs there were four sites with variously configured non-operational systems: 9020A and 9020E support and development systems at the FAA's NAFEC; 9020A and 9020E training systems at the FAA Academy; a simplex 9020D support system co-located with the CAA's operational triplex 9020D London system, and a 9020A at Raytheon for testing their display system.

On June 9, 1977 a treaty “IRAN - Aviation: Technical Assistance”  was signed between the FAA and the Civil Aviation Organization of Iran. Under the terms of the treaty the FAA would provide technical assistance to improve the Iranian National Airspace System. This assistance included the installation of a 9020D and 9020E and associated equipment at a cost of $29m (out of a total contract cost of $272m). The treaty fell foul of the 1979 Iranian Islamic Revolution and the systems were never delivered.

Longevity and follow-on systems
The 9020As and 9020Ds were in service in North America until 1989 when they were finally replaced by IBM 3083 BX1 mainframes as part of the FAA's HOST Computer System (HCS) upgrade. The 3083s in turn were replaced with IBM 9672 RA4 parallel processing servers during the FAA's Host and Oceanic Computer System Replacement (HOCSR) completed in 1999. One reason for the 1999 upgrade was concern, probably unfounded, that the IBM 3083's microcode would not operate properly in the year 2000. At least during the first phase of the upgrade, the 9672s were running the FAA's original assembly language code in System/360 emulation mode. Because of the failure of the FAA's Advanced Automation System (AAS) project, the 9020E Display Channel Complexes lasted well into the 1990s.

NATS in the UK had a 9020D system in service running NAS from 1974 to 1989, at which time NAS was rehosted on to an IBM 4381 system. This system was known as the Host Computer System (HCS), and it retained the System/360 technology Peripheral Adapter Modules (PAMs) from the 9020D. The three PAMs (IBM 7289s) were switched off for the last time 27 November 1997 when their replacement (SPRINT) came into service.

Sources
  pictures of 9020E being recycled
  Article about the PAM final switch-off

References

Air traffic control
9020